Patrick Spaziante, or "Spaz" as he is commonly known, is an American comic book artist known for his work for Archie Comics, in particular his interior pencil and cover work for Sonic the Hedgehog, Sonic X and Sonic Universe. He is also known for his work on Dreamwave Productions' Teenage Mutant Ninja Turtles, Nickelodeon Comics' Avatar: The Last Airbender and Marvel Comics' Muties, as well as his illustration work for Simon & Schuster's children books.

Career
Spaziante was a member of a group along with Ken Penders and Steven Butler known collectively as "Team Sonic" (not to be confused with "Sonic Team", the original creators of the SEGA franchise), because of their extensive work on the series. The trio interviewed with Offenberger as they approached the 150th edition of the Sonic the Hedgehog series. In the interview, Spaz talked about the early years he spent as an up-and-coming comic book artist with Archie Comics and what it was like to work his way up.

The first comic he is credited for designing the cover art for was Sonic the Hedgehog #21 (April 1995). Spaziante also worked on Sonic the Hedgehog #25 (August 1995), which was adapted directly from Sonic CD, released two years prior to the release of that comic.
			
Spaziante's other works include Mega Man and Transformers for Dreamwave Productions' Teenage Mutant Ninja Turtles, the miniseries Muties for Marvel Comics,  and Avatar: The Last Airbender for Nickelodeon Comics, which was based on the television series of the same name.

Spaziante has also worked on children's books for Simon & Schuster, in particular the Olivia series and the Avatar book Journeys Through the Earth Kingdom.

Critical reception
Rafael Gaitan, reviewing Mega Man #2 for Comics Bulletin, found Spaziante's pencils to be "clean and tight", lauding them for accurately capturing the video game's look, and manga-inspired action style. Comics Bulletin's Penny Kenny, reviewing Mega Man Volume 1: Let the Games Begin trade paperback, called that book's artwork "dynamic and expressive", praising the clarity of its sequences.

References

External links
Official Publisher Page. Simon & Schuster.
Patrick Spaziante at ComicVine

Living people
American comics artists
Year of birth missing (living people)